The phrase "Islamisation of knowledge" was first used and proposed by the Malaysian scholar Syed Muhammad Naquib al-Attas in his book "Islam and Secularism"  (first published in 1978). Calling it a 'burgeoning enterprize', Vali Nasr equates Islamization of knowledge project with the 'Third worldist world-view of sorts', which, in his opinion, 'is rooted in the reassertion of Muslim religious loyalties in the face of cataclysmic changes which have torn many Muslim societies asunder'. He argues that the project has mostly been shaped 'in the spirit of a political discourse than a level-headed academic undertaking'. It was pioneered by the self-styled thinkers with no expertise in the field they were trying to revolutionize. Rather than advancing Islamic knowledge, it has caused disjuncture between knowledge and faith in Islam.

See also
 Islamization
Islamic advice literature
 Islamic revival
 Early Islamic philosophy
 Islamic philosophy
 Torah Umadda, a philosophy concerning the interrelationship of secular knowledge and Jewish knowledge

References

External links 
 The Islamization of science or the marginalization of Islam: The positions of Seyyed Hossein Nasr and Ziauddin Sardar
 The Islamization of Social Sciences
 Liberal and progressive Islam from Alan Godlas' Islamic resources page at the University of Georgia
 Islam and Knowledge: Al Faruqi's Concept of Religion in Islamic Thought by Imtiyaz Yusuf (Editor) 

Epistemological theories
Islamic ethics
Islam and science